Mendez, officially the Municipality of Mendez-Nuñez,  is a 4th class municipality in the province of Cavite, Philippines. According to the 2020 census, it has a population of 34,879 people.

Etymology 
The municipality of Mendez-Nuñez was originally known as "Gahitan", one of the many barrios of Indang. The name was derived from the word "gahit" meaning "to cut", because the people then had to cut down tall and thick cogon grass that abounded in the place in order to clear areas for agricultural and residential purpose.

History

1875-1903
As time went on, the number of houses in Gahitan increased so that the sitio eventually became a barrio and finally a full-fledged town on 1 December 1875, thanks to Governor-General Jose Malcampo y Monje (1874-1877). Malcampo incorporated the three barrios of Gahitan, Palocpoc and Anuling into one independent municipality called Méndez Núñez, after a Spanish naval officer and close friend, Commodore Casto Méndez Núñez. In 1856, when they were still Spanish naval officers, Malcampo and Mendez-Nuñez, established the first Masonic lodge in Kawit under a charter from the Grand Lodge of Portugal. The friendship of these two officers had been tested in many a battle against Muslim pirates in Mindanao.

Pedro Aure was the gobernadorcillo of Mendez during its first year as a municipality in 1876. Cayetano Aure, perhaps a relative of Pedro, was the first and only capitan municipal of Mendez during the First Philippine Republic (1899-1901). Pedro's son, Marcelino Aure, became a famous general during the Philippine Revolution. His nom de guerre was Alapaap (Cloud).

Mendez continued to be a municipality from 1875 to 15 October 1903 when, under Public Act No. 947 of the Philippine Commission reduced the 22 municipalities of Cavite to nine. Mendez and Bailen (now General Aguinaldo) were incorporated into the municipality of Alfonso.

1915-Present
But 12 years later, on 1 January 1915, Mendez regained its independent status as a municipality of Cavite Province.

Geography
It is one of the smallest and upland towns of Cavite province. It is bounded to the north and east by Indang, to the south by Tagaytay, and to the west by Alfonso.

Barangays
Mendez is politically subdivided into 24 barangays.

Climate
While it shares a general climate as the rest of the province Mendez' climate, due to its proximity to Tagaytay City, is tropical highland, with low temperatures most especially during the early dry season.

Demographics

Economy

Government

Elected officials
The following are the elected officials of the municipality elected last May 09, 2022 which serves until 2025:

References

External links

Profile: Mendez, Cavite - Official Website of the Province of Cavite
Profile: Mendez, Cavite - DILG Calabarzon Region
[ Philippine Standard Geographic Code]
Philippine Census Information

Municipalities of Cavite